Lami José Lutzenberger Biological Reserve is a municipal biological reserve near Porto Alegre, Rio Grande do Sul, Brazil.

Formation

The Lami José Lutzenberger Biological Reserve was established in 1975 in the Lami neighborhood of the city of Porto Alegre, and named after the local agronomist and environmentalist José Lutzenberger. It was the first municipal reserve in Brazil.
The park reopened in April 2002 after being closed for more than ten years to allow its ecosystems to recover.
The reserve conserves nature and supports research and environmental education.

Environment

The conservation area includes riparian forests, wetlands, reeds, salt marshes, and fields, which support a wide variety of species of flora and wildlife. 
More than 300 native plant species have been identified and over 200 species of native birds, including local and migratory species.
The reeds provides nurseries for fish, amphibians and molluscs, and turtles and lizards lay their eggs in the sandy elevations.
Small groups of the semi-aquatic capybara (Hydrochoerus hydrochaeris) can be found in the riparian forests.
Other species include the broad-snouted caiman (Caiman latirostris) and neotropical otter (Lontra longicaudis).
Endangered plant species include Ficus cestrifolia, Erythrina crista-galli and Butia capitata.

Notes

Sources

1975 establishments in Brazil
Biological reserves of Brazil
Protected areas of Rio Grande do Sul